Flavien Michelini (born 20 July 1986 in Rillieux-la-Pape, France) is a French midfielder who plays for Bangkok in the Thai Division 1 League.

Honours

Club
Étoile FC
 S.League Champion (1) : 2010
 Singapore League Cup Winner (1) : 2010

External links

1986 births
Living people
French footballers
FC Gueugnon players
AFC Compiègne players
SO Romorantin players
Flavien Michelini
Flavien Michelini
Flavien Michelini
Singapore Premier League players
French expatriate footballers
French expatriate sportspeople in Singapore
Expatriate footballers in Singapore
Flavien Michelini
Flavien Michelini
French expatriate sportspeople in Thailand
Expatriate footballers in Thailand
Association football midfielders
Étoile FC players
Sportspeople from Lyon Metropolis
Footballers from Auvergne-Rhône-Alpes